In mathematics, the Paley–Wiener integral is a simple stochastic integral. When applied to classical Wiener space, it is less general than the Itō integral, but the two agree when they are both defined.

The integral is named after its discoverers, Raymond Paley and Norbert Wiener.

Definition
(We have abused notation slightly: strictly speaking, but since  is a Hilbert space, it is isometrically isomorphic to its dual space , by the Riesz representation theorem.)

Furthermore, it can be shown that every linear functional  is also square-integrable: in fact,

This is well-defined since  is injective. This map is an isometry, so it is continuous.

This isometry  is known as the Paley–Wiener map.

The notation  does not really denote an inner product (since  and  belong to two different spaces), but is a convenient abuse of notation in view of the Cameron–Martin theorem. For this reason, many authors prefer to write  or  rather than using the more compact but potentially confusing  notation.

See also
Other stochastic integrals:
 Itō integral
 Skorokhod integral
 Stratonovich integral

References

 (Section 6)

Definitions of mathematical integration
Stochastic calculus